The Porsche 547 and Porsche 547/3 are naturally-aspirated, flat-four, boxer racing engines, designed by Porsche for Formula One racing; between  and

History
In October 1958, the Fédération Internationale de l'Automobile (FIA) announced that for the 1961 Formula One season, engine capacity would be limited to the same 1.5 litres as in Formula Two (F2). This meant that Porsche could use their F2 cars almost unchanged in F1. The 787 would not get the eight-cylinder though, continuing with the air-cooled, DOHC four-cylinder Type 547 boxer engine that had been developed by Ernst Fuhrmann and that had powered the 550 Spyders and 718 series until then. It was powered by a 547/3 four-cylinder engine with Kugelfischer fuel injection. At Monaco the car retired when the fuel injection cut out. A second car, also fitted with the 547/3 engine, was completed in time to appear in the Dutch Grand Prix on 22 May alongside the other 787.

Technical data

Applications
Porsche 787
Porsche 718

References

Porsche
1961 in Formula One
Formula One engines
Porsche in motorsport
Boxer engines
Engines by model
Gasoline engines by model